Eisgruber is a surname. Notable people with the surname include:

Anton Eisgruber (1912–1994), German skier
Christopher L. Eisgruber (born 1961), American legal scholar and university president